Muirodelphax is a genus of delphacid planthoppers in the family Delphacidae. There are about 13 described species in Muirodelphax.

Species
These 13 species belong to the genus Muirodelphax:

 Muirodelphax altaica (Vilbaste, 1965)
 Muirodelphax amol Dlabola, 1981
 Muirodelphax arvensis (Fitch, 1851)
 Muirodelphax atralabis (Beamer, 1948)
 Muirodelphax atratulus Vilbaste, 1968
 Muirodelphax aubei (Perris, 1857)
 Muirodelphax litoralis Vilbaste, 1968
 Muirodelphax luteus (Beamer, 1946)
 Muirodelphax nigrostriata (Kusnezov, 1929)
 Muirodelphax parvulus (Ball, 1902)
 Muirodelphax peneluteus (Beamer, 1948)
 Muirodelphax pinanorum (Anufriev, 1991)
 Muirodelphax unda (Metcalf, 1923)

References

Further reading

External links

Delphacini
Articles created by Qbugbot
Auchenorrhyncha genera